The Master of Disguise is a 2002 American adventure comedy film directed by Perry Andelin Blake in his directorial debut, written by Dana Carvey and Harris Goldberg, and starring Carvey, Brent Spiner, Jennifer Esposito, Harold Gould and James Brolin. The film was produced by Carvey's fellow Saturday Night Live alumnus, Adam Sandler, through Happy Madison Productions. It tells the story of a man who is trained to become a "Master of Disguise" by his grandfather when a master criminal kidnaps his parents.

The film grossed $43.4 million on a $16 million budget but was panned by critics, having a 1% approval rating on Rotten Tomatoes. Critics have called it one of the worst movies ever made.

Plot
In 1979 Palermo, Italy, Fabbrizio Disguisey, the latest in a long line of secret agents known as "Masters of Disguise", breaks up a smuggling ring run by the evil Devlin Bowman while disguised as Bo Derek. Not wanting his infant son Pistachio to receive the same dangerous future lifestyle as he and his lineage, Fabbrizio decides to keep his family's nature a secret.

Twenty-three years later, Fabbrizio runs an Italian restaurant in an unnamed town in America with his wife and son Pistachio. Released from prison three years earlier, Bowman and his henchmen kidnap Fabbrizio and his wife, forcing Fabbrizio to use his talents to steal legendary artifacts around the world to reestablish Bowman's smuggling ring. After Fabbrizio's disappearance, Pistachio is visited by his grandfather, who reveals Pistachio's heritage and begins training him.

Pistachio gets the basics down and his grandfather gets him an assistant, Jennifer Baker, who is a little confused about what the job entails. The two find one of Bowman's cigars in the alley where his parents were kidnapped which leads them to the Turtle Club where it was made and they learn of Bowman's scheme, as well as that he will be at an antiques fair the next day.

Pistachio and Jennifer go to the fair, with Pistachio disguised as an elderly woman. Bowman invites Jennifer to a party at his house. Pistachio goes to the party in disguise and distracts Bowman while Jennifer looks for clues.

That night, Pistachio and Jennifer look through the clues. Bowman's men kidnap Jennifer, so Pistachio talks to his grandfather via a crystal ball and comes up with a scheme to break into Bowman's lair to rescue Jennifer and his parents. They confront Bowman who has attached a mask of his face to Fabbrizio's head. While the real Bowman escapes, Pistachio fights his father, who is brainwashed to think he is Bowman.

In the end, Pistachio helps his father snap out of his trance, and they free Pistachio's mother and return the artifacts. Pistachio marries Jennifer and becomes an official Master of Disguise. However, they eventually realize that Bowman still got away and has the United States Constitution with him. The Disguiseys locate Bowman in Costa Rica, defeat him in their disguises, and retrieve the Constitution.

Cast

Kenan Thompson, Bo Derek, Michael Johnson, Jessica Simpson, and an uncredited Jesse Ventura make cameo appearances as themselves.

Production
There is a longstanding rumor that the filming of the scene in the Turtle Club took place on September 11, 2001, causing production to stop and observe a moment of silence during the terrorist attacks. The rumor includes that Carvey was in the full turtle outfit and makeup during the solemn moment. The rumor is believed to have stemmed from a piece of trivia on the movie's IMDb page, a section that includes user-generated content and is not subject to rigorous fact-checking. A Defector Media interview with director Perry Blake confirmed that a moment of silence for the victims of the attack was held and that Carvey was in the turtle outfit during the moment of silence, but that the moment took place a few weeks after the attacks. The morning of 9/11, the movie was still in pre-production, and filming was scheduled to begin in a couple of weeks.

Release
The Master of Disguise was granted a PG certificate by the British Board of Film Classification for "mild language and mild comic violence". To obtain the PG certificate, seven seconds of material was cut, the reasons being "dangerous imitable technique, a series of head butts".

Box office
The film opened in Australia on July 31, 2002, in the United States on August 2, 2002, and in the United Kingdom on January 17, 2003 in 2,565 theaters and earned $12,554,650 in the domestic box office, ranking third for the weekend, behind Signs and the second weekend of Austin Powers in Goldmember. The film closed on November 28, 2002, having grossed $40,388,794 domestically and $3,022,207 internationally for a worldwide total of $43,411,001. When the film was released in the United Kingdom, it originally opened at #14, before falling out of the charts completely by the next weekend.

Critical reception
On Rotten Tomatoes, the film has an approval rating of 1% based on 104 reviews with an average rating of 2.60/10, making it the lowest-rated film produced by Revolution Studios to date. Its consensus reads: "An ill conceived attempt to utilize Dana Carvey's talent for mimicry, The Master of Disguise is an irritating, witless farce weighted down by sophomoric gags." On Metacritic, the film has a score of 12 out of 100 based on reviews from 24 critics, indicating "overwhelming dislike". Audiences surveyed by CinemaScore gave the film a grade "B−" on scale of A to F.

Roger Ebert, awarding the film a rating of one star out of four, reserved some praise for director Perry Andelin Blake's production design, as well as for Carvey's imitative abilities, but saw the overall movie as being "like a party guest who thinks he is funny and is wrong". Ebert also noted that the film is only 65 minutes long, but includes 15 minutes of credit cookies in order to qualify as a feature presentation.  Jamie Russell at the BBC described the film as being so bad as to make other movies such as Deuce Bigalow: Male Gigolo seem like comic equivalents to Citizen Kane: "Never have so many jokes clunked off the screen to such a silent audience. And never has 80 minutes seemed like such an eternity."

Peter Bradshaw, writing for The Guardian, awarded the film two stars out of five, citing a limited number of amusing moments, but criticizing Carvey's characterizations and suggesting to the potential audience member that "you might want to put the shotgun in your mouth".  Adam Smith in the Radio Times drew attention to the "lame screenplay" and "barely coherent plot", and noted that "when the nearest thing to a genuine joke is the bad guy's propensity for breaking wind whenever he laughs, you can be pretty sure that you're not in the hands of comedy geniuses".

Alan Morrison, writing for Empire, suggested that it was no more than a feeble imitation of the character comedy of the Austin Powers series, concluding that The Master of Disguise was the single worst movie ever made: "a film about idiots, made by idiots, for idiots".  Comedian and former Mystery Science Theater 3000 host Michael J. Nelson named the film the third-worst comedy ever made.

Accolades
Bo Derek's cameo in the film earned her a Golden Raspberry Award nomination for Worst Supporting Actress, but lost to Madonna in Die Another Day.

At the 2002 Stinkers Bad Movie Awards, the film was nominated for Worst Picture, Worst Actor, and Worst Male Fake Accent — the latter two regarding Carvey. Its only win was a tie with Kung Pow: Enter the Fist for Most Painfully Unfunny Comedy.

Home media
The film was released on VHS and DVD on January 28, 2003.

Soundtrack

See also
 List of films considered the worst

References

External links
 
 

2002 films
American fantasy films
2000s English-language films
2000s adventure comedy films
American adventure comedy films
American satirical films
Films produced by Adam Sandler
Films shot in Los Angeles
Films set in 1979
Films set in 2002
American slapstick comedy films
Happy Madison Productions films
Revolution Studios films
Columbia Pictures films
Films set in Palermo
Films set in Washington, D.C.
Films set in Pennsylvania
Films set in Philadelphia
Cultural depictions of George W. Bush
2002 directorial debut films
2002 comedy films
2000s American films